Phostria lithosialis is a moth in the family Crambidae. It was described by Achille Guenée in 1854. It is found in Brazil, Ecuador and Peru.

References

Phostria
Moths described in 1854
Moths of South America